Bohumila "Míla" Myslíková (14 February 1933 – 11 February 2005) was a Czech actress. She appeared in over 90 films and television shows between 1954 and 1993. She starred in the 1974 film Kdo hledá zlaté dno, which was entered into the 25th Berlin International Film Festival.

Selected filmography
 Hvězda zvaná Pelyněk (1964)
 Capricious Summer (1968)
 The Cremator (1969)
 Tři oříšky pro Popelku (1973)
 Who Looks for Gold? (1974)
 How to Drown Dr. Mracek, the Lawyer (1974)
 How the World Is Losing Poets (1982)
 Jára Cimrman Lying, Sleeping (1983)
 How Poets Are Losing Their Illusions (1985)
 How Poets Are Enjoying Their Lives (1988)

References

External links
 

1933 births
2005 deaths
Czech film actresses
Czech stage actresses
People from Třebíč
20th-century Czech actresses